Eugenia mozomboensis is a species of plant in the family Myrtaceae. It is endemic to Veracruz state, in eastern Mexico. It is an Endangered species, threatened by habitat loss.

References

mozomboensis
Endemic flora of Mexico
Flora of Veracruz
Endangered biota of Mexico
Endangered flora of North America
Trees of Veracruz
Taxonomy articles created by Polbot